The following is a list of dual-touchscreen devices. Note this list does not include unreleased devices.

References

Touchscreens